Panicum sumatrense, known as little millet, is a species of millet in the family Poaceae.

Description
This species of cereal is similar in habit to the proso millet except that it is smaller. The leaves are linear, with the sometimes hairy laminae and membranous hairy ligules.

Subspecies
There have been two subspecies described:
Panicum sumatrense Roth ex Roem. & Schult. subsp. psilopodium (Trin.) Wet.
Panicum sumatrense Roth ex Roem. & Schult. subsp. sumatrense

Distribution and habitat
In the temperate zones of Asia: the Caucasus, China, East Asia and also in the tropics of the continent: India, Indochina and Malaysia.

It can withstand both drought and waterlogging. It can be cultivated up to 2000 m above sea level.

Common names
Hindi: Kutki, Shavan. 
Bengali : Sama. 
Tamil : Samai. 
Gujarati : Gajro, Kuri. 
Telugu : Samalu (సామలు).
Marathi : Sava, Halvi, Vari. 
Oriya : Suan.
Kannada : Saame (ಸಾಮೆ). 
Malayalam : Chama (ചാമ).

Cultivation
The largest cultivation is in central India. Usually, it is planted using a seed drill. It can also if necessary be planted spoiled. The green plant can also be used in part as cattle feed. The straw can be mixed with clay or cement be used in construction.

The harvest yield is from 230 to 900 kg/ha.

Pests
Pests include the shoot fly Atherigona pulla, which also affects proso millet.

Other insect pests include:

shoot fly, Atherigona miliaceae
armyworms, Mythimna separata and Spodoptera frugiperda

Leaf feeders
caterpillars: Euproctis virguncula, Amsacta moorei, Amsacta albistriga, and Amsacta lactinea
flea beetles: Chaetocnema basalis, Chaetocnema indica, and Chaetocnema denticulata
larvae of the leaf folder Cnaphalocrocis medinalis
grasshoppers: Chrotogonus hemipterus, Acrida exaltata, Aiolopus simulatrix, and Aiolopus tamulus

Earhead feeders
bugs Nezara viridula and Dolycoris indicus

Panicle pests
spotted stalk borer Chilo partellus

Others
Nephotettix virescens, Nephotettix nigropictus, and Nisia atrovenosa
sugarcane leafhopper, Pyrilla perpusilla
midge, Orseolia sp.

Archaeobotany
At the Indus Valley civilisation sites of Harappa and Farmana, the millet assemblage was dominated by little millet. Over 10,000 grains of little millet were recovered at Harappa. At Harappa, little millet cultivation peaked at around 2600 BC, accounting for around 5% of the total cereal assemblage.

Preparation
Little millet is cooked like rice. Sometimes the millet is also milled and baked. The protein content of the grain is 7.7%.

Notes

References

W. Franke, (1985): Nutzpflanzenkunde. Stuttgart. 
H. Genaust: Etymologisches Wörterbuch der botanischen Pflanzennamen. 3. Aufl., 701 S. Basel-Boston-Stuttgart, 1996. 
V. H. Heywood: Blütenpflanzen der Welt. Basel-Boston-Stuttgart, 1978 

This article is based on a translation of the corresponding article in the German Wikipedia.

sumatrense
Millets
Crops originating from Asia
Grasses of Asia
Flora of Sumatra
Cereals